Daniel Iglesias (born 14 May 1962) is an Argentine former wrestler. He competed in two events at the 1988 Summer Olympics.

References

External links
 

1962 births
Living people
Argentine male sport wrestlers
Olympic wrestlers of Argentina
Wrestlers at the 1988 Summer Olympics
Place of birth missing (living people)
20th-century Argentine people
21st-century Argentine people